The Artyom constituency (No.63) is a Russian legislative constituency in Primorsky Krai. The constituency was created in 2016 from parts of all 3 former Primorsky Krai constituencies. Artyom constituency stretches from Fokino, Vladivostok and Artyom in the south to Spassk-Dalny in the north.

Members elected

Election results

2016

|-
! colspan=2 style="background-color:#E9E9E9;text-align:left;vertical-align:top;" |Candidate
! style="background-color:#E9E9E9;text-align:leftt;vertical-align:top;" |Party
! style="background-color:#E9E9E9;text-align:right;" |Votes
! style="background-color:#E9E9E9;text-align:right;" |%
|-
|style="background-color:"|
|align=left|Vladimir Novikov
|align=left|United Russia
|
|37.76%
|-
|style="background-color:"|
|align=left|Aleksey Kornienko
|align=left|Communist Party
|
|15.13%
|-
|style="background-color:"|
|align=left|Roman Meleshkin
|align=left|Liberal Democratic Party
|
|12.55%
|-
|style="background-color: " |
|align=left|Olga Kolchina
|align=left|Communists of Russia
|
|8.79%
|-
|style="background:"| 
|align=left|Aleksey Kozitsky
|align=left|A Just Russia
|
|8.35%
|-
|style="background-color:"|
|align=left|Larisa Butenko
|align=left|Party of Growth
|
|4.41%
|-
|style="background:"| 
|align=left|Aleksey Klyotskin
|align=left|Yabloko
|
|2.86%
|-
|style="background-color:"|
|align=left|Viktor Kaplunenko
|align=left|Rodina
|
|2.34%
|-
|style="background-color:"|
|align=left|Vladimir Shcherbatyuk
|align=left|The Greens
|
|1.69%
|-
| colspan="5" style="background-color:#E9E9E9;"|
|- style="font-weight:bold"
| colspan="3" style="text-align:left;" | Total
| 
| 100%
|-
| colspan="5" style="background-color:#E9E9E9;"|
|- style="font-weight:bold"
| colspan="4" |Source:
|
|}

2021

|-
! colspan=2 style="background-color:#E9E9E9;text-align:left;vertical-align:top;" |Candidate
! style="background-color:#E9E9E9;text-align:left;vertical-align:top;" |Party
! style="background-color:#E9E9E9;text-align:right;" |Votes
! style="background-color:#E9E9E9;text-align:right;" |%
|-
|style="background-color:"|
|align=left|Vladimir Novikov (incumbent)
|align=left|United Russia
|
|35.44%
|-
|style="background-color:"|
|align=left|Andrey Akimov
|align=left|Communist Party
|
|29.74%
|-
|style="background-color: " |
|align=left|Aleksey Kozitsky
|align=left|A Just Russia — For Truth
|
|8.24%
|-
|style="background-color:"|
|align=left|Vyacheslav Baydelyuk
|align=left|Party of Pensioners
|
|6.01%
|-
|style="background-color:"|
|align=left|Nikolay Selyuk
|align=left|Liberal Democratic Party
|
|5.05%
|-
|style="background-color:"|
|align=left|Denis Grigoryev
|align=left|New People
|
|3.50%
|-
|style="background-color:"|
|align=left|Kirill Batanov
|align=left|Party of Growth
|
|2.40%
|-
|style="background-color:"|
|align=left|Aleksandr Rudkovsky
|align=left|Russian Party of Freedom and Justice
|
|2.10%
|-
|style="background:"| 
|align=left|Sergey Poltorak
|align=left|Yabloko
|
|1.62%
|-
| colspan="5" style="background-color:#E9E9E9;"|
|- style="font-weight:bold"
| colspan="3" style="text-align:left;" | Total
| 
| 100%
|-
| colspan="5" style="background-color:#E9E9E9;"|
|- style="font-weight:bold"
| colspan="4" |Source:
|
|}

References

Russian legislative constituencies
Politics of Primorsky Krai